Mic or MIC may refer to:
 Microphone, an acoustic transducer

Places
 Federated States of Micronesia, UNDP country code
 Miami Intermodal Center, a mega-transportation hub in Miami, Florida
 Microscopium, a constellation

People
 Mic (name), numerous people

Arts, entertainment, and media
 M.I.C. (band), a Chinese band formed by Taihe Rye Music
 Mic (media company), an American digital company specializing in news and entertainment for millennials
 Mic, an abbreviation for referencing the Book of Micah
 Made in Chelsea, a television series

Organizations

Business
 Metal Improvement Company, a company specializing in metal surface treatments
 Merida Industry Co., Ltd., a bicycle manufacturing company in Taiwan
 Military Industries Corporation (Saudi Arabia), the main armament industry for the Saudi military
 Military Industry Corporation, the main armament industry for the Sudanese military
 Myanmar Investment Commission, a government-appointed body
 Mortgage investment corporation, a Canadian investment and lending company
 Motorcycle Industry Council, an American non-profit trade association
 MIC (organization), a Russian construction organization

Government and politics
 Malaysian Indian Congress, a Malaysian political party
 Military–industrial complex, the relationship between a nation's military forces, its arms industry, and government
 Military Intelligence Corps (Sri Lanka), a Sri Lankan military corp that is responsible for gathering, analyzing, and distributing military intelligence
 Military Intelligence Corps (United States Army), the intelligence branch of the United States Army, responsible for gathering, analyzing, and distributing military intelligence
 Ministry of Information and Communication (South Korea), a government agency
 Ministry of Internal Affairs and Communications, a Japanese government agency

Other organizations
 Marians of the Immaculate Conception, a Roman Catholic clerical congregation
 Mary Immaculate College, a college in Limerick, Ireland
 Metropolitan Interscholastic Conference, a high school athletic conference in Indiana
 Mic (media company), a media company focused on news for millennials
 Multan Institute of Cardiology, Pakistan

Science and medicine
 Major immunogene complex, gene complex coding immune response
 Maximal information coefficient, a statistical measure of association between variables
 Medical image computing, an interdisciplinary field
 Metal-induced crystallization, a method for turning amorphous silicon into polycrystalline silicon
 Metastable intermolecular composite, a type of reactive material in explosives research
 Methyl isocyanate, a chemical compound used in pesticides
 Microbial corrosion, or microbially-induced corrosion, corrosion caused or promoted by microorganisms
 Minimum inhibitory concentration, in microbiology, the lowest concentration of an antimicrobial that will inhibit growth of a microorganism
 Morbus ischaemicus cordis, Latin for coronary artery disease
 Medically induced coma

Technology
 Machine Identification Code, a watermark generated by some printers
 Mandatory Integrity Control, a new security feature in Microsoft Windows Vista
 Intel MIC, Intel's Many Integrated Core processor architecture
 Media Interface Connector, for fiber optics
 Message Integrity Code, a cryptographic checksum used in wireless communications
 Micrometer (device), a measuring tool
 Microscope, an instrument for optical magnification
 Microsoft Innovation Center, Microsoft partners
 Microwave integrated circuit, a type of integrated circuit

Other uses
 Market Identifier Code, or ISO 10383, a unique identification code, which serves as a standard to identify securities trading exchanges, regulated and non-regulated trading markets
 Mi'kmaq language, by ISO 639 alpha-2 language code
 Middle income country, a developing country
 Crystal Airport (Minnesota), by IATA code

See also

MICS (disambiguation)
Microphone (disambiguation)